Bedtime for Democracy is the fourth and final studio album by American punk rock band Dead Kennedys. Released in 1986, songs on this album cover common punk subjects often found in punk rock lyrics of the era such as conformity, Reaganomics, the U.S. military, and critique of the hardcore punk movement. The album's title refers to the 1951 comedy film, Bedtime for Bonzo starring Ronald Reagan and also reflects the band's weary bitterness from the trial they were undergoing at the time over the controversial art included with their previous album. By the time recording of Bedtime for Democracy had begun, the Dead Kennedys had already played what would be their last concert with Jello Biafra and announced their breakup immediately after the release of the record, whose opening track is a cover of David Alan Coe's "Take This Job and Shove It."

Track listing

Personnel
Dead Kennedys
 Jello Biafra - lead vocals, producer, mixer
 East Bay Ray - guitar
 Klaus Flouride - bass, backing vocals
 D.H. Peligro - drums, backing vocals
Additional performers
 Tim Jones - synthesizer on "One-Way Ticket to Pluto" 
 Jayed Scotti - timbales on "Dear Abby"
 Cal - backing vocals on "Fleshdunce", "Where Do Ya Draw The Line?" and "Chickenshit Conformist"
 Andrew - backing vocals on "Fleshdunce", "Where Do Ya Draw The Line?" and "Chickenshit Conformist"
 Blaze - backing vocals on "Fleshdunce", "Where Do Ya Draw The Line?" and "Chickenshit Conformist"
 P. O'Pillage - the voice of Rambozo on "Rambozo The Clown", artwork
Production
 John Cuniberti - engineer, mixer
 Winston Smith - artwork

Charts

Related

The East Bay punk band Isocracy parodied the name in their 1988 EP, Bedtime for Isocracy. The cover art depicted the band together in a bed, accompanied by Jello Biafra. After the record's release, Isocracy split up, with two members forming the group Samiam and another joining Green Day.

Certifications

References

1986 albums
Alternative Tentacles albums
Dead Kennedys albums